Au Rêve is the second studio album by French electronic duo Cassius, released in 17 September 2002 by Virgin Records in Europe and Astralwerks in the United States.

Writing, production and content 
The album was written and produced by Cassius members Zdar and Boombass.

Au Rêve is a progression from Cassius' debut album 1999 in that it is a more traditional house-oriented effort that uses less sampling and more live vocalists. Collaborators include Jocelyn Brown, Ghostface Killah and Steve Edwards. The Edwards track, "The Sound of Violence", topped the U.S. Hot Dance Club Play chart.

Reception 

Au Rêve has received a mixed reception from critics. David Silverman of BBC Music called it "Excellent in places, awkward and peculiar in others" and wrote: "There's nothing really new here, but then that isn't really the criteria for whether an album is good or not – its just a pity Cassius couldn't recapture the spontaneity of 1999."

Track listing

Charts

References 

2002 albums
Cassius (band) albums
Astralwerks albums
Virgin Records albums